Brunia apicalis is a moth of the family Erebidae. It was described by Francis Walker in 1862. It is found on Borneo. The habitat consists of forests, ranging from lowlands to 1,200 meters.

References

Lithosiina
Moths described in 1862
Insects of West Africa
Moths of Africa